A commercial district or commercial zone is any part of a city or town in which the primary land use is commercial activities (shops, offices, theaters, restaurants and so on), as opposed to a residential neighbourhood, an industrial zone, or other types of neighbourhoods. In some cities, authorities use planning or zoning laws to define the boundaries of commercial districts.

Terminology

English 
In the United Kingdom, commercial districts that are primarily for shopping are called high streets.  In North America, in smaller towns and cities there is often only one main commercial district, which is located on the main street.  In larger cities and towns there may be multiple commercial districts, often with more specialized functions.  If a city has one large central area of offices and professional buildings, this is called the Central Business District or CBD (term used especially, but not exclusively, in Australian and New Zealand English), or downtown (North American English with the exception of Liverpool, England, who also uniquely use the term 'downtown' ).  "CBD" and "downtown" usually refer to centrally located areas of a city and are of predominate importance within their city, which differentiates them from other commercial districts. The financial district of a city is the specific area of either a larger CBD or downtown or separate zone and would typically house a stock exchange or several bank headquarters. Likewise, city centre is sometimes used as a synonym for CBD or downtown, but often the geographical centre of a city not a commercial district.  Often the centre of a city in older cities has many historic, institutional, or cultural areas.

Other languages
Most languages do not have a direct cognate for commercial district, but will have a related term such as the French quartier d'affaires ("business quarter"), or the Japanese shōtengai (literally, "commerce shop street").

See also

Related terms 
 Commercial area
 Central Business District, downtown, city centre
 high street, main street
 shōtengai

Specific usage of "commercial district" as a name
 Boneyfiddle Commercial District, Portsmouth, Ohio, USA
 Broadway Theater and Commercial District, Los Angeles, California, USA
 Clematis Street Historic Commercial District,  West Palm Beach, Florida, USA
 Liverpool Commercial District, Liverpool, UK
 Ocala Historic Commercial District, Ocala, Florida, USA
 Titusville Commercial District, Titusville, Florida, USA

Other
 List of leading shopping streets and districts by city
 Joel Wachs, Los Angeles City Council member who authored law requiring commercial developers to set aside funds for art

Neighbourhoods by type